Mjältön is an island in the middle of The High Coast in Sweden. Mjältön is the highest island in Sweden, with a height of 236 meters above sea level.

Islands of Västernorrland County